Elatine gratioloides  is a species of flowering plant belonging to the family Elatinaceae.

Its native range is Australia to the south-west Pacific, including New Zealand.

It was first described in 1839 by Allan Cunningham, who described it from a specimen from "a bog at Tauraki, Hokianga river".

References

External links 
 Elatine gratioloides images & occurrence data at GBIF
NZPCN: Elatine gratioloides: images
Elatine gratioloides images at iNaturalist

Elatinaceae
Taxa named by Allan Cunningham (botanist)
Plants described in 1839